Orange Is the New Black is an American comedy-drama series created by Jenji Kohan. It is based on Piper Kerman's memoir, Orange Is the New Black: My Year in a Women's Prison (2010), about her experiences at FCI Danbury, a minimum-security federal women's prison. The series' first season premiered on July 11, 2013 on the streaming service Netflix. Orange Is the New Black has been a significant success for Netflix, becoming its most-watched original series. The series has received critical acclaim since its debut, and many awards and nominations in both comedy and drama categories.

Orange Is the New Black has received 16 Emmy Award nominations and four wins. For its first season, the series received 12 Emmy Award nominations, including Outstanding Comedy Series, Outstanding Writing for a Comedy Series, and Outstanding Directing for a Comedy Series, winning three. After an Emmy rule change in 2015 classifying half-hour shows as comedies and hour-long shows as dramas, the series received four Emmy nominations in drama for its second season, including Outstanding Drama Series, and Uzo Aduba won for Outstanding Supporting Actress in a Drama Series. Orange Is the New Black became the first series to receive Emmy nominations in both comedy and drama categories. Aduba's win made her the first actress, and second actor ever, to win drama and comedy Emmy awards for the same role, following her win for Outstanding Guest Actress in a Comedy Series the previous year.

The series has also received six Golden Globe Award nominations, six Writers Guild of America Award nominations, a British Academy Television Award nomination, as well as four Screen Actors Guild Awards (including two for Outstanding Performance by an Ensemble in a Comedy Series), four Critics' Choice Television Awards, two GLAAD Media Awards, a Television Critics Association Award, a Producers Guild of America Award, and a Peabody Award.

Total nominations and awards for the cast

Major Associations

British Academy Television Awards

Golden Globe Awards

Grammy Awards

Primetime Emmy Awards

Primetime Creative Arts Emmy Awards

Producers Guild of America Awards

Screen Actors Guild Awards

Television Critics Associations Awards

Writers Guild of America Awards

Other associations

ALMA Awards

American Cinema Editors Awards

American Film Institute Awards

ASCAP Music Awards

Artios Awards

Black Reel Awards

Crime Thriller Awards

Critics' Choice Television Awards

Directors Guild of America Awards

Dorian Awards

Gracie Allen Awards

GLAAD Media Awards

Guild of Music Supervisors Awards

Hollywood Music in Media Awards

IGN Awards

Makeup Artist and Hair Stylist Guild Awards

NAACP Image Awards

NewNowNext Awards

Online Film & Television Association Awards

Peabody Awards

People's Choice Awards

Satellite Awards

Screenwriters Choice Awards

Critics' top ten lists

References 

Notes

External links 
 Orange Is the New Black on Netflix
 

Orange Is the New Black
Orange Is the New Black